Carl Friederich Christian Kelling (21 June 1818 – 28 December 1898), generally known as Charles Frederick Christian Kelling, was a New Zealand emigration agent, farmer and community leader. He was born on 21 June 1818 in Klütz, Grand Duchy of Mecklenburg-Schwerin. He was the older brother of Fedor Kelling. He died at Wakefield. He represented the Moutere (1862–1869) and then the Waimea West (1869–1873) electorates on the Nelson Provincial Council.

References

1818 births
1898 deaths
People from Nordwestmecklenburg
People from the Grand Duchy of Mecklenburg-Schwerin
German emigrants to New Zealand
Members of the Nelson Provincial Council
New Zealand farmers
19th-century New Zealand politicians